Musrigharari is a small town and Nagar Panchayat in Samastipur district of Bihar state, India. Musrigharari is located at an approximate distance of 8 kilometers from Samastipur city.

It has very busy roads and this area is still developing. Other neighboring villages are connected to it via roads. The development in this area is mainly due to well connected roads and its location. Years ago this region was, like any other village, not so populated, but as time went by peoples from neighboring villages bought lands and began settling here, as it served a good location to open shops and other businesses. Other reasons included its proximity to other big towns. There is a intersection of 4 roads around which the shops are mostly concentrated and it also serves as a site for events of Muharram, which is a major festival for Muslims here.

It serves as a area for business purposes, education, recreation and religious purposes. Peoples from neighboring villages and towns send their kids to schools in this area. Main business shops include cloth stores, Vegetable shops and food item shops, and hardware and electronic shops. There are many hindu temples devoted to many hindu deities like goddess kali or shiva and there are also some mosques.

School, college and private tutoring institutions are also present in abundance. The fair during the events of Muharram serves as a recreational gathering of peoples of all religions. Its main religions are Hinduism and Islam and other religions such as Buddhism or Sikhism are present in negligible amount. The literacy rate is below average and there are many people who believes in superstitions and other religious and cultural myths, as is the case of neighboring villages and towns or literally most peoples of Bihar.

Location
4 lane National Highway 28 & National Highway 322 (AH42) passes through Musrigharari, Samastipur.

References

Cities and towns in Samastipur district